Hispanopithecus is a genus of apes that inhabited Europe during the Miocene epoch. Anthropologists disagree as to whether Hispanopithecus belongs to the subfamily Ponginae (most closely related to modern orangutans) or Homininae (most closely related to gorillas, chimpanzees, and humans).

The genus contains two known species: Hispanopithecus laietanus and Hispanopithecus crusafonti. The fossils have been dated to between 11.1 and 9.5 million years ago.

Morphology
Postcranial features exhibit morphological features that suggest a mosaic of locomotive behaviors. The structure of the cortical bone at the proximal and distal ends of the femur, particularly the neck of the femoral head, indicate an orthograde body plan. Recovered vertebrae indicate a relatively short, wide, and deep thorax support the orthograde posture for climbing, clambering, and feeding in an arboreal environment. The longer forelimbs and dorsally situated scapulae provide a broad range of motion which would enable suspensory below-branch behavior and proficiency in reaching food during foraging.

The humeral-ulnar joint allowed for hyperextension and flexion of the forearm. The robust carpals and metacarpals with dorsally extended articular surfaces provide strong indication of palmigrade quadrupedalism in above-branch locomotion. The proximal phalanges are strongly curved and relatively long when compared to other great apes and most closely resembling the structure of extant orangutans. The length and curvature of the manual phalanges indicates the 'double-locking' mechanism similar to orangutans and enable a powerful grip around slender branches.

The body mass estimates of recovered specimens provides strong evidence of sexual dimorphism.

Diet and environment
Analysis of the microwear of the teeth of Hispanopithecus indicate a morphological preference for softer foods, including fruits and possibly young leaves. A combination of surface scratches and pitting are indicative of a mixed diet, lacking many hard foods like nuts and seeds except in times of soft food scarcity and lacking wear patterns common with heavy folivore diets. Linear hypoplasia is common, which would suggest episodes of malnutrition stress during dental development, indicating the need for fall-back foods in the diet when preferred foods are unavailable.

Evidence suggests that the environment of Hispanopithecus on the Iberian Peninsula was tropical to subtropical with marsh-like features. Flora of the period is preserved as samples of evergreen laurels, palms, reeds, and marsh herbs in wet areas and diverse leguminous trees and shrubs in lowland dry areas. Figs have been preserved in the stratographic layer which also contained hominid teeth, which would have been available year-round in the Middle Miocene. The climate changed in the Late Miocene to a cooler, dryer, less tropical environment. This would have brought seasonal change which would have impacted the available food sources of Hispanopithecus, possibly contributing to extinction near this time.

See also

References

Prehistoric apes
Miocene primates of Europe
Fossil taxa described in 1944
Prehistoric primate genera
Miocene mammals of Europe